Norma Broude (born 1 May 1941) is an American art historian and scholar of feminism and 19th-century French and Italian painting. She is also a Professor Emerita of art history from American University. Broude, with Mary Garrard, is an early leader of the American feminist movement and both have redefined feminist art theory.

Life and work 
She was born Norma Freedman on 1 May 1941 in New York. She holds a Master of Arts and Doctor of Philosophy in Art History from Columbia University and a Bachelor of Arts in Art History and English from Hunter College.

Broude taught for a short time at Oberlin College, then Vassar College and Columbia University. In 1975 she was called to the American University and stayed there until retirement.

Broude is known for her publications on the reassessments of Impressionists: Edgar Degas, Gustave Caillebotte, Mary Cassatt and Georges Seurat. Since 1982 Broude has collaborated with Mary Garrard and has published numerous classics of feminist art history, most notably The Expanding Discourse: Feminism and Art History.

Awards 
 2000 – Committee on Women in the Arts presented their annual recognition award at the College Art Association.
 1981 – National Endowment for the Humanities
 1962 – Scholarship Woodrow Wilson National Fellowship Foundation

Publications 
 Gustave Caillebotte: And the Fashioning of Identity in Impressionist Paris, Norma Broude 2002, 
 The Power of Feminist Art: The American Movement of the 1970s, History and Impact, with Mary D. Garrard 1996, 
 The Expanding Discourse: Feminism and Art History, with Mary D. Garrard 1992, 
 Impressionism: A Feminist Reading: The Gendering of Art, Science, and Nature in the Nineteenth Century, Norma Broude 1991, 
 Feminism and Art History: Questioning the Litany, with Mary D. Garrard 1982, 
 Seurat in Perspective. Norma Broude 1978 
 The Macchiailoli: Academicism and Modernism in Nineteenth Century Italian Painting, Norma Broude, Columbia 1967, 
 World Impressionism, featured in the Seinfeld episode The Bookstore

References 

Living people
1941 births
American art historians
American University faculty and staff
Columbia University Graduate School of Journalism alumni
Hunter College alumni
Women art historians
American women historians
20th-century American historians
20th-century American women writers
21st-century American historians
21st-century American women writers